Celsonil Santos de Macedo Júnior (born 15 March 1988), commonly known as Celsinho is a Brazilian professional footballer who plays for Remo as a right back.

Club career
Born in São Bernardo do Campo, Celsinho graduated from the youth academy of Pato Branco and made his senior debut in 2005. In the following years, he played for Francisco Beltrão, Coritiba, Lajeadense and signed for Juventude on 22 June 2010.

After spending the 2012 season on loan from Lajeadense at  Bangu, Celsinho's loan deal was extended for the 2013 season in November 2012. Ahead of the 2014 season, he joined Caldense. In the following year, he signed for Novo Hamburgo. After playing for the side in Campeonato Gaúcho in early 2016, he switched to Cianorte of Campeonato Paranaense. However, he rejoined Novo Hamburgo on 7 June 2016.

On 22 December 2016, Celsinho moved to CSA. He played sparingly, with his side winning promotion to Série B. On 20 June 2018, he scored his first Série B goal in a 1–1 draw against Ponte Preta. He played regularly for the club, with his side winning the Campeonato Alagoano and achieving promotion to Série A, after  finishing runners-up in Série B. On 10 December, he extended his contract for the upcoming season.

References

External links
Celsinho at playmakerstats.com (English version of ogol.com.br)

1988 births
Living people
Association football defenders
Brazilian footballers
Campeonato Brasileiro Série B players
Campeonato Brasileiro Série C players
Campeonato Brasileiro Série D players
Pato Branco Esporte Clube players
Coritiba Foot Ball Club players
Clube Esportivo Lajeadense players
Esporte Clube Juventude players
Bangu Atlético Clube players
Ypiranga Futebol Clube players
Associação Atlética Caldense players
Esporte Clube Novo Hamburgo players
Cianorte Futebol Clube players
Centro Sportivo Alagoano players
People from São Bernardo do Campo
Footballers from São Paulo (state)